Mariela Andrea Antoniska Arrondo (20 May 1975) is an Argentine field hockey goalkeeper, who won the silver medal with the national field hockey team at the 2000 Summer Olympics in Sydney, the bronze medal at the 2004 Summer Olympics in Athens, the 2002 World Cup, the Champions Trophy in 2001, two Pan American Games and the Pan American Cup in 2001.

Arrondo was born in Banfield, Buenos Aires.

References

External links
 
 
 

1975 births
Living people
Argentine female field hockey players
Female field hockey goalkeepers
Las Leonas players
Olympic field hockey players of Argentina
Field hockey players at the 2000 Summer Olympics
Field hockey players at the 2004 Summer Olympics
Olympic silver medalists for Argentina
Olympic bronze medalists for Argentina
Sportspeople from Buenos Aires Province
People from Banfield, Buenos Aires
Olympic medalists in field hockey
Medalists at the 2000 Summer Olympics
Medalists at the 2004 Summer Olympics
Pan American Games gold medalists for Argentina
Pan American Games medalists in field hockey
Field hockey players at the 1999 Pan American Games
Field hockey players at the 2003 Pan American Games
Medalists at the 1999 Pan American Games
Medalists at the 2003 Pan American Games
a
20th-century Argentine women
21st-century Argentine women